Bjørn Magnussen (born 2 January 1998) is a Norwegian speed skater.

He won a medal at the 2020 World Single Distances Speed Skating Championships.

References

External links
 
 
 

1998 births
Living people
Norwegian male speed skaters
Sportspeople from Trondheim
World Single Distances Speed Skating Championships medalists
World Sprint Speed Skating Championships medalists
Speed skaters at the 2022 Winter Olympics
Olympic speed skaters of Norway
21st-century Norwegian people